Llanvihangel-Ystern-Llewern is a village in the community of Whitecastle, in Monmouthshire, south east Wales. It is located between Abergavenny and Monmouth and north of Raglan. The River Trothy passes close by.

History and amenities 
Joseph Bradney, the antiquarian and author of A History of Monmouthshire from the Coming of the Normans into Wales down to the Present Time, acquired the nearby estate of Tal-y-coed Court, partly by inheritance and partly through purchase, where he settled at an early age. A Latin tablet in St Michael's Church in the village records his achievements. Bradney was also the owner of The Pant in the village, a late-medieval house, with an attached Quaker Meeting House.

The Offa's Dyke Path long distance footpath passes through the village. The village has a parish church dedicated to St. Michael.

References

External links 
 Genuki basic info on the village
 www.geograph.co.uk : photos of Llanvihangel-Ystern-Llewern and surrounding area
 

Villages in Monmouthshire